Zulma is a feminine given name that derives from the Ottoman Empire Sultan named Suleiman the Magnificent and some say it is also derives from the Hebrew "shâlôm", meaning "peace, completeness (in number), safety, soundness (in body), welfare, health, prosperity, quiet, tranquility, contentment, friendship, of human relationships, with god especially in covenant relationship".

Art and literature

Zulma Bouffar (1841–1909), French entertainer
Zulma Carraud (1796–1889), French author
Zulma Faiad (born 1944), Argentinian entertainer
Zulma Steele (1881–1979), American artist

Other persons

Zulma Brandoni de Gasparini (born 1944), Argentinian scientist
Zulma Hernández (born 1998), Mexican footballer
Zulma Yugar (born 1952), Bolivian politician

See also

Zulmasuchus

References

Hebrew feminine given names